Oneroa is a settlement on Waiheke Island in northern New Zealand. 

The New Zealand Ministry for Culture and Heritage gives a translation of "long beach" for Oneroa.

Whittaker's Music Museum, a specialist music museum, has operated in Oneroa since 1996.

Demographics

Oneroa West had a population of 1,434 at the 2018 New Zealand census, an increase of 9 people (0.6%) since the 2013 census, and an increase of 147 people (11.4%) since the 2006 census. There were 606 households, comprising 699 males and 735 females, giving a sex ratio of 0.95 males per female. The median age was 48.6 years (compared with 37.4 years nationally), with 195 people (13.6%) aged under 15 years, 198 (13.8%) aged 15 to 29, 705 (49.2%) aged 30 to 64, and 339 (23.6%) aged 65 or older.

Ethnicities were 91.2% European/Pākehā, 10.3% Māori, 3.1% Pacific peoples, 3.8% Asian, and 3.6% other ethnicities. People may identify with more than one ethnicity.

The percentage of people born overseas was 34.5, compared with 27.1% nationally.

Although some people chose not to answer the census's question about religious affiliation, 63.2% had no religion, 24.5% were Christian, 0.2% had Māori religious beliefs, 0.2% were Muslim, 0.8% were Buddhist and 2.7% had other religions.

Of those at least 15 years old, 438 (35.4%) people had a bachelor's or higher degree, and 150 (12.1%) people had no formal qualifications. The median income was $36,000, compared with $31,800 nationally. 303 people (24.5%) earned over $70,000 compared to 17.2% nationally. The employment status of those at least 15 was that 588 (47.5%) people were employed full-time, 225 (18.2%) were part-time, and 36 (2.9%) were unemployed.

References

Populated places on Waiheke Island